Gongan or Gong'an may refer to:

Gong'an County (公安县), Jingzhou, Hubei, China
Gong'an, Zhongshan County (公安镇), town in Guangxi, China
Gong'an fiction, a subgenre of Chinese crime fiction revolving around government magistrates solving criminal cases
Kōan, also known as Gongan, story, dialogue, question, or statement in Chán Buddhism
Gonganbu, or the Ministry of Public Security, the PRC's domestic security agency, civil registrar and police force 
Gongan, the time span between gong ageng strikes in gamelan music